USS PCS-1379 was the fourth of twelve patrol craft sweepers constructed by Wheeler Shipbuilding Corporation, Whitestone, Long Island, New York.

She was one of a total of 59 of this type to be delivered to the Navy by various shipyards. PCS-1376 through 1387 were designed as submarine chasers, but were launched after the need for coastal escorts had passed.

PCS-1379 spent much of World War II in the Pacific Theater. She was one of thirteen PCS vessels converted to a PCS(C) for control of landing craft with the aft 40 mm mount replaced by a small deckhouse.

Service history
Delivered in March 1944 her plank-holding crew reported for duty aboard PCS-1379 at Lido Beach, New York.

PCS-1379 transited the Panama Canal to Hawaii before participating in combat. She crossed the equator at 163 deg East, north to south on 23 August 1944.

During the Mariana and Palau Islands campaign she participated in the invasion of Peleliu Island and Angaur Island on 15–17 September 1944. She shelled Japanese targets on Eil Malk and Abappaomogan Islands on 30–31 October 1944.

In the Volcano and Ryukyu Islands campaign of 1945 she participated in the invasion of the Ryukyu Islands as follows:  
 Kerama Retto, 26–31 March 1945
 Okinawa, 1 April 1945
 Menna Shima, 15 April 1945
 Ie Shima, 16 April 1945

PCS-1379 returned to Hawaii, and then back through the Panama Canal, reaching Long Island, NY on or around 15 August 1945.

References
 Conway's All The World's Fighting Ships 1922-1946, Conway Maritime Press, Ltd. / Mayflower Books, New York, 1980, .
navsource.org: PCS-1379

PCS-1376-class minesweepers
Ships built in Queens, New York
1944 ships
World War II patrol vessels of the United States
World War II minesweepers of the United States